Bennett Gluyas Hair (29 September 1892 – 1 October 1974) was an Australian rules footballer who played for the South Melbourne Football Club and St Kilda Football Club in the Victorian Football League (VFL).

Notes

External links 

1892 births
1974 deaths
Australian rules footballers from Melbourne
Sydney Swans players
St Kilda Football Club players
People from Port Melbourne